Marie's Soldier is a 1927 German silent drama film directed by Erich Schönfelder and starring Xenia Desni, Harry Liedtke and Grit Haid. It was shot at the Johannisthal Studios and the backlot of the Babelsberg Studios in Berlin. The film's art direction was by Kurt Richter. The film is based on Leo Ascher's 1913 operetta of the same name.

Cast

References

External links

Der Soldat der Marie, filmportal.de

Films of the Weimar Republic
German drama films
German silent feature films
1927 drama films
Films directed by Erich Schönfelder
UFA GmbH films
German black-and-white films
Films based on operettas
Silent drama films
1920s German films
Films shot at Johannisthal Studios
Films shot at Babelsberg Studios